Matjaž Cvikl  (13 January 1967 – 27 July 1999) was a Slovenian footballer who played as a forward.

Club career
Born in Slovenj Gradec, Cvikl began playing professional football with local side Rudar Velenje before moving to Maribor. Cvikl played for Rudar Velenje and Maribor in the Slovenian PrvaLiga. He had spell with Zeytinburnuspor in the Turkish Super Lig from 1993 to 1995.

International career
Cvikl made six appearances for the senior Slovenia national football team.

Personal
After suffering from a long illness, Cvikl died in Ljubljana in July 1999.

See also
NK Maribor players

References

External links

Profile at PrvaLiga 

1967 births
1999 deaths
Sportspeople from Slovenj Gradec
Yugoslav footballers
Slovenian footballers
Association football forwards
Slovenian PrvaLiga players
Slovenian expatriate footballers
NK Rudar Velenje players
Expatriate footballers in Turkey
Slovenian expatriate sportspeople in Turkey
Zeytinburnuspor footballers
NK Maribor players
Süper Lig players
Slovenia international footballers